Chasselay is the name of the following communes in France:

 Chasselay, Isère, in the Isère department
 Chasselay, Rhône, in the Rhône department